Arjun Chidambaram is an Indian actor, who has appeared in Tamil language films. He made his debut as an actor in Moone Moonu Varthai (2015). He made a breakthrough appearing in Nerkonda Paarvai (2019). He has since appeared in leading and supporting roles in films.

Career
Arjun is a theatre artist who acts in plays. Arjun himself wrote plays such as First Day, First Show. Arjun worked with the Evam and Stray Factory. He got the opportunity as the protagonist of S. P. B. Charan's production, Moone Moonu Varthai. In 2017, he signed onto Rum where he played a deaf and mute hacker.

Arjun got his break through role as Adhik in H. Vinoth's Nerkonda Paarvai alongside Ajith Kumar. He played the antagonist of the film who attempts to abuse a woman and takes revenge once she refused. Arjun took the role as it will set an example of how men should not be and the film opens up discussion about sexual violence and consent. Arjun has been officially cast in Mani Ratnam's Ponniyin Selvan: I.

Filmography

Films

Web series

Short films

Dubbing artist

References

External links 
 

Living people
Indian Tamil people
Actors from Tamil Nadu
Male actors in Tamil cinema
Actors in Tamil theatre
21st-century Indian male actors
Year of birth missing (living people)